Hervé Berville (born 15 January 1990) is a French economist and politician of La République En Marche! (LREM) who has been serving as State Secretary for the Sea in the government of Prime Minister Élisabeth Borne since 2022. From 2017 to 2022, he was a member of the French National Assembly, representing the department of Côtes-d'Armor. He was also a spokesperson of this party.

Early life and education
A survivor of the Rwandan genocide, Berville was adopted by a French couple in Brittany, graduated from the London School of Economics and worked for Stanford University. During his studies, he conducted research in Kenya in 2016. Berville is active in the French intellectual circles.

Political career
In the French National Assembly, Berville was a member of the Committee on Foreign Affairs. In addition to his committee assignments, he served as vice chairman of the French Parliamentary Friendship Group for relations with Burundi and Rwanda.

In April 2020, Berville was dispatched by President Emmanuel Macron to Kigali to officially represent the French government at the commemorations on the occasion of the 25th anniversary of the massacre of Rwandans.

Political positions
In July 2019, Berville voted in favor of the French ratification of the European Union’s Comprehensive Economic and Trade Agreement (CETA) with Canada.

Other activities
 Bill & Melinda Gates Foundation, Member of the Advisory Group of the Goalkeepers Initiative (since 2022)
 French Development Agency (AFD), Member of the Supervisory Board

See also
 2017 French legislative election

References

1990 births
Living people
Deputies of the 15th National Assembly of the French Fifth Republic
La République En Marche! politicians
Black French politicians
Alumni of the London School of Economics
Rwandan emigrants to France
French adoptees
French people of Rwandan descent
Members of the Borne government